Steve Drowne, (born 10 December 1971),<ref name="Birthdays">Racing Post, London, 10 December 2021, page 18.</ref> is a former professional flat racing jockey. Growing up, he attended Newmarket Racing School. His father was a Devon farmer.

Drowne is one of racing's most respected senior riders. He had a long association with trainer Roger Charlton. Steve retired at the end of 2017 and became a stipendiary steward.

Major wins
 Great Britain
 Cheveley Park Stakes - (1) - Queens Logic (2001) July Cup – (1) –  Sakhee's Secret (2007)  Nunthorpe Stakes – (1) –  Jwala (2013) Ireland
 Moyglare Stud Stakes – (1) – Mail The Desert (2002)

 France
 Prix de l'Abbaye de Longchamp - (2) - Patavellian (2003), Avonbridge (2005)

References

External links 
 An Article on Drowne
 Drowne's Statistics

Living people
English jockeys
People educated at Shebbear College
Lester Award winners
1971 births